American singer Amy Lee rose to fame as the co-founder and lead vocalist of the rock band Evanescence. She has embarked on a solo venture throughout Evanescence's fame, but her solo career became more prominent during the band's hiatus in 2014. She has written and recorded material for one studio album, one extended play, one soundtrack album and featured on three tribute albums namely, Nightmare Revisited (2008).

In the early 2000s, Lee performed collaborations with David Hodges and Big Dismal. She has also recorded guest vocals for Seether's 2004 single "Broken" and Korn's 2007 acoustic rendition of "Freak on a Leash", which reached number twenty and 89 on Billboard Hot 100 respectively. Lee has no co-writing credits on any of these collaborations.

After being released from her record label, Wind-up Records, in 2013, Lee announced on Twitter that she and Evanescence were independent artists. Thus, began embarking on her film score career by composing the soundtrack to War Story (2014), which lead to the release of Aftermath. Lee, Dave Eggar and Chuck Palmer wrote most of the album together. The soundtrack reached number 47 on Billboard 200 and produced one promotional single called "Lockdown". Lee has also collaborated with Eggar and Palmer on the films Indigo Grey: The Passage (2015) and Blind (2017). Lee also co-wrote "Speak to Me" with Michael Wandmacher for the film Voice from the Stone (2016).

In 2016, Lee released her debut extended play titled Recover, Vol. 1, which features four cover songs namely "With or Without You" by U2 and "Baby Did a Bad Bad Thing" by Chris Isaak. Later that year, Lee collaborated with several members of her immediate family to record a children's album titled Dream Too Much. The album includes eight original songs and four covers songs. Lee has three sole-writing credits and five co-writing credits. Her sister, Lori Lee, is credited to have co-written three songs on the album. Lee's father, John Lee, and her husband, Joshua W. Hartzler, each have two co-writing credits. The title track was released as a promotional single.

"Love Exists" is an English rendition of "L'amore esiste" by Francesca Michielin released as a stand-alone single in February 2017. Lee is credited to have sole writing credits for the English translation. The original Italian version was written by Fortunato Zampaglione and Michele Canova. Lee has also provided guest vocals for songs by Lindsey Stirling in 2019, and Body Count, Wagakki Band and Bring Me the Horizon in 2020, including co-writing credits.

Released songs

Unreleased songs

Bootleg covers 
The following includes bootleg recordings of live cover songs from concerts, which were not officially released by Lee or under any other legal authority.

Notes

See also 
List of songs recorded by Evanescence
Evanescence discography

References 

General
 

Specific

External links 
 

Amy Lee